Facing the Truth may refer to:
 Facing the Truth (TV programme), a British 3-part television programme originally broadcast in 2006
 Facing the Truth (film) (Danish: At kende sandheden), a 2002 Danish drama film